Seeds of Freedom may refer to:
 "Seed of Freedom", a song by Young Jessie
 Seeds of Freedom, a 1929 film by Leonid Leonidov
 Seeds of Freedom, a 1943 film starring Aline MacMahon and Junius Matthews 
 Seeds of Freedom, a 2012 documentary featuring Melaku Worede and Percy Schmeiser